Lupinus excubitus is a species of lupine known as the grape soda lupine. Its common name refers to its sweet scent, which is said to be very reminiscent of grape soda. This species and its variants are found in Southwestern United States, especially in California and Nevada, e.g., Death Valley and Joshua Tree National Parks, and northwestern Mexico.

Description
Lupinus excubitus is a small shrub with gray-green foliage. The fan-shaped leaves are borne on the stem and may be clustered at the base. Generally covered with silvery hairs, each is made up of 7 to 10 narrow  leaflets. The raceme inflorescence is a tall stalk of rich purple flowers, each with a bright yellow spot. The occasional variant has white flowers.

There are several named variants of this species, including:
L. e. var. austromontanus - southern mountain lupine
L. e. var. excubitus - grape soda lupine, Inyo bush lupine
L. e. var. hallii - Hall's bush lupine
L. e. var. johnstonii - interior bush lupine
L. e. var. medius - Mountain Springs bush lupine, Colorado bush lupine

References

External links

Photo gallery: Lupinus excubitus
Photo gallery: Lupinus excubitus var. austromontanus
Photo gallery: Lupinus excubitus var. excubitus

excubitus
Flora of California
Flora of Nevada
Flora of Northwestern Mexico
Flora of the California desert regions
Flora of the Great Basin
Flora of the Sierra Nevada (United States)
Flora of the Sonoran Deserts
Natural history of the California chaparral and woodlands
Natural history of the Colorado Desert
Natural history of the Mojave Desert
Natural history of the Peninsular Ranges
Flora without expected TNC conservation status